William or Bill Brawley may refer to:

 William H. Brawley (1841–1916), U.S. Representative from South Carolina and U.S. federal judge 
 William M. Brawley (born 1949), member of the North Carolina General Assembly
 Billy Brawley (born 1984), Scottish footballer
"Big Bill" Brawley, a character in the film The Bruiser